The following television stations operate on virtual channel 46 in the United States:

 K04SB-D in Bakersfield, California
 K12LU-D in West Glacier, etc., Montana
 K15KO-D in Redding, California
 K17NF-D in Brookings, South Dakota
 K21MV-D in Farmington, New Mexico
 K22GX-D in Tri City, Oregon
 K24MO-D in Tyler, Texas
 K24MX-D in Deming, New Mexico
 K25QA-D in Odessa, Texas
 K27MV-D in Durant, Oklahoma
 K27NF-D in Jackson, Minnesota
 K27NX-D in Ridgecrest, California
 K28MS-D in Bismarck, North Dakota
 K30OK-D in Tulsa, Oklahoma
 K31NA-D in Altus, Oklahoma
 K33MI-D in Aberdeen, South Dakota
 K35GR-D in Badger, South Dakota
 K46FY-D in Redwood Falls, Minnesota
 KBPX-LD in Houston, Texas
 KCCF-LD in Atascadero, California
 KDLT-TV in Sioux Falls, South Dakota
 KEXI-LD in Kalispell, Montana
 KFTR-DT in Ontario, California
 KION-TV in Monterey, California
 KLAF-LD in Lafayette, Louisiana
 KNCT in Belton, Texas
 KNMW-LD in Mineral Wells, Texas
 KOCM in Norman, Oklahoma
 KQML-LD in Kansas City, Missouri
 KQVE-LD in San Antonio, Texas
 KRNS-CD in Reno, Nevada
 KTCW in Roseburg, Oregon
 KTLO-LD in Colorado Springs, Colorado
 KUKL-TV in Kalispell, Montana
 KUSE-LD in Seattle, Washington
 KUVE-DT in Green Valley, Arizona
 KUVN-CD in Fort Worth, Texas
 KXTQ-CD in Lubbock, Texas
 W20EH-D in Pownal, etc., Vermont
 W33EI-D in Raleigh, North Carolina
 W34FB-D in Hamilton, Alabama
 W36FK-D in Pittsburgh, Pennsylvania
 W45DN-D in Washington, D.C.
 WALV-CD in Indianapolis, Indiana
 WANF in Atlanta, Georgia
 WBFT-CD in Sanford, North Carolina
 WBGT-CD in Rochester, New York
 WBSF in Bay City, Michigan
 WCTU-LD in Pensacola, Florida
 WHME-TV in South Bend, Indiana
 WIDP in Guayama, Puerto Rico
 WJZY in Belmont, North Carolina
 WKLE in Lexington, Kentucky
 WMBQ-CD in New York, New York
 WPCT in Panama City Beach, FLorida
 WRBU in East St. Louis, Illinois
 WSKG-TV in Binghamton, New York
 WTPX-TV in Antigo, Wisconsin
 WUOA-LD in Birmingham, Alabama
 WWDP in Norwell, Massachusetts
 WWWN-LD in Memphis, Tennessee
 WXCW in Naples, Florida

The following stations, which are no longer licensed, formerly operated on virtual channel 46:
 K35NI-D in Three Forks, Montana
 K46MX-D in Lowry, South Dakota
 KHLU-CD in Honolulu, Hawaii
 KMKI-LD in Cedar Falls, Iowa
 W46EO-D in Culebra, Puerto Rico
 WWEK-LD in Augusta, Georgia

References

46 virtual